In Greek mythology, Phorcys or Phorcus is a primordial sea god, generally cited (first in Hesiod) as the son of Pontus and Gaia (Earth). Classical scholar Karl Kerenyi conflated Phorcys with the similar sea gods Nereus and Proteus. His wife was Ceto, and he is most notable in myth for fathering by Ceto a host of monstrous children.  In extant Hellenistic-Roman mosaics, Phorcys was depicted as a fish-tailed merman with crab-claw legs and red, spiky skin.

Parents 
According to Hesiod's Theogony, Phorcys is the son of Pontus and Gaia, and the brother of Nereus, Thaumus, Ceto, and Eurybia. In a genealogy from Plato's dialogue Timaeus, Phorcys, Cronus and Rhea are the eldest offspring of Oceanus and Tethys.

Offspring 
Hesiod's Theogony lists the children of Phorcys and Ceto as the Graeae (naming only two: Pemphredo, and Enyo), the Gorgons (Stheno, Euryale and Medusa), probably Echidna (though the text is unclear on this point) and Ceto's  "youngest, the awful snake who guards the apples all of gold in the secret places of the dark earth at its great bounds", also called the Drakon Hesperios ("Hesperian Dragon", or dragon of the Hesperides) or Ladon.  These children tend to be consistent across sources, though Ladon is often cited as a child of Echidna by Typhon and therefore Phorcys and Ceto's grandson.

According to Apollodorus, Scylla was the daughter of Crataeis, with the father being either Trienus (Triton?) or Phorcus (a variant of Phorkys). Apollonius of Rhodes has Scylla as the daughter of Phorcys and a conflated Crataeis-Hecate. According to a fragment of Sophocles, Phorcys is the father of the Sirens.

The scholiast on Apollonius of Rhodes cites Phorcys and Ceto as the parents of the Hesperides, but this assertion is not repeated in other ancient sources.

Homer refers to Thoosa, the mother of Polyphemus, as a daughter of Phorcys, with no mother specified.

Notes

References
 Apollodorus, Apollodorus, The Library, with an English Translation by Sir James George Frazer, F.B.A., F.R.S. in 2 Volumes. Cambridge, MA, Harvard University Press; London, William Heinemann Ltd. 1921.  Online version at the Perseus Digital Library.
 Athanassakis, Apostolos N, Hesiod: Theogony, Works and days, Shield, JHU Press, 2004. .
 Caldwell, Richard, Hesiod's Theogony, Focus Publishing/R. Pullins Company (June 1, 1987). .
 Clay, Jenny Strauss, Hesiod's Cosmos, Cambridge University Press, 2003. .
 Fowler, R. L. (2000), Early Greek Mythography: Volume 1: Text and Introduction, Oxford University Press, 2000. .
 Fowler, R. L. (2013), Early Greek Mythography: Volume 2: Commentary, Oxford University Press, 2013. .
 Freeman, Kathleen, Ancilla to the Pre-Socratic Philosophers: A Complete Translation of the Fragments in Diels, Fragmente Der Vorsokratiker, Harvard University Press, 1983. .
 Gantz, Timothy, Early Greek Myth: A Guide to Literary and Artistic Sources, Johns Hopkins University Press, 1996, Two volumes:  (Vol. 1),  (Vol. 2).
 Grimal, Pierre, The Dictionary of Classical Mythology, Wiley-Blackwell, 1996. . Internet Archive.
 Hesiod, Theogony, in Hesiod, Theogony, Works and Days, Testimonia, edited and translated by Glenn W. Most, Loeb Classical Library No. 57, Cambridge, Massachusetts, Harvard University Press, 2018. . Online version at Harvard University Press.
 Homer, The Odyssey with an English Translation by A. T. Murray, Ph.D. in two volumes, Cambridge, Massachusetts, Harvard University Press; London, William Heinemann, Ltd., 1919. Online version at the Perseus Digital Library.
 Hyginus, Gaius Julius, The Myths of Hyginus. Edited and translated by Mary A. Grant, Lawrence: University of Kansas Press, 1960.
Kerenyi, Karl 1951 (1980). The Gods of the Greeks.
 Morford, Mark P. O., Robert J. Lenardon, Classical Mythology, Eighth Edition, Oxford University Press, 2007. .
 Ogden, Daniel (2013), Drakōn: Dragon Myth and Serpent Cult in the Greek and Roman Worlds, Oxford University Press, 2013. . Google Books.
 Plato, Timaeus. Critias. Cleitophon. Menexenus. Epistles, translated by R. G. Bury, Loeb Classical Library No. 234, Cambridge, Massachusetts, Harvard University Press, 1929. . Online version at Harvard University Press.
 Rose, Herbert Jennings, "Echidna" in  The Oxford Classical Dictionary, Hammond and Scullard (editors), Second Edition, Oxford University Press, 1992. 
 Smith, William; Dictionary of Greek and Roman Biography and Mythology, London (1873).
 Sophocles, Fragments, edited and translated by Hugh Lloyd-Jones, Loeb Classical Library No. 483, Cambridge, Massachusetts, Harvard University Press, 1996. . Online version at Harvard University Press.

External links
 Theoi Project – Phorcys
  Greek Mythology at Mythologica

Children of Gaia
Greek sea gods
Deities in the Iliad
Children of Oceanus
Mermen